The Tête de l'Obiou accident was on 13 November 1950. Curtiss-Reid Flying Service had been operating a scheduled service between Paris and Rome since 1945. All 51 passengers and 7 crew were killed.

Flight attendant Helen Johnston's body was missing for weeks until it was found in a crevasse on the mountain.

Accident narrative

The aircraft was carrying fifty-one pilgrims, all but two of whom were Canadians and fifteen of whom were Catholic priests, on the return leg to Montreal Dorval airport from a Holy Year pilgrimage in Rome. After departing Rome Ciampino at 14:16, it crossed the Mediterranean via Bastia in Corsica, whence the flight plan called for it to pass over the Istres non-directional beacon. Whereas the crew reported its position at Istres at 16:26, the aircraft was already some 40 nautical miles to the east. A second position report, at 16"44, put it over Montelimar, whereas it was in reality in the vicinity of the airport at Gap-Tallard. Some fifteen minutes later, the aircraft struck the top of the 9,150-feet high Tête de l'Obiou mountain, less than six feet from the summit. Night was falling and the mountain was enveloped by cloud at the time of the accident. All on board were killed instantly. Alpine rescuers soon reached the scene notwithstanding severe conditions, one being killed by an avalanche during the ascent. However, the ruggedness of the terrain and the high impact forces greatly impeded the recovery operation. Fifteen of the dead were never identified. In July 1951, six Italian forest workers were prosecuted for looting the crash site and stealing money, jewellery and religious objects from the wreckage.

See also
Grande Tête de l'Obiou

References

External links
 
 Final report of the french Bureau Enquêtes / Accidents, in french
 Gendarmerie (police) report, in french
 Report from the Aix control center, in french

Airliner accidents and incidents involving controlled flight into terrain
Aviation accidents and incidents in 1950
Aviation accidents and incidents in France
Accidents and incidents involving the Douglas DC-4
November 1950 events in Europe
1950 in France